The 1993–94 Western Kentucky Hilltoppers men's basketball team represented Western Kentucky University during the 1993–94 NCAA Division I men's basketball season. The Hilltoppers were led by coach Ralph Willard and future NBA player Chris Robinson.  The team won the Sun Belt Conference Championship and were Sun Belt Basketball tournament runners-up.  They received an at-large bid to the 1994 NCAA Division I men's basketball tournament.

Robinson made the All-Conference and SBC Tournament team.

Schedule

|-
!colspan=6| Regular season

|-

|-
!colspan=6| 1994 Sun Belt Conference men's basketball tournament

|-
!colspan=6| 1994 NCAA Division I men's basketball tournament

References

Western Kentucky
Western Kentucky Hilltoppers basketball seasons
Western Kentucky
1993 in sports in Kentucky
1994 in sports in Kentucky